WBOA-CD, channel 29, was a class-A low-power television station licensed to Kittanning, PA. The station broadcast QVC Over the Air and it was owned by Local Media TV.

History
WBOA-CD was owned by Benjamin Perez of Abacus Television until it and four other stations were sold to Fifth Street Enterprises.

On April 13, 2017, the Federal Communications Commission (FCC) announced that WBOA-CD was a successful bidder in the spectrum auction, and would be surrendering its license in exchange for $19,660,828. Local Media TV surrendered WBOA-CD's license to the FCC for cancellation on August 28, 2017.

References

External links

Television stations in Pittsburgh
Low-power television stations in the United States
Television channels and stations established in 1999
1999 establishments in Pennsylvania
Defunct television stations in the United States
Television channels and stations disestablished in 2017
2017 disestablishments in Pennsylvania
BOA-CD